Hypatopa scobis is a moth in the family Blastobasidae. It is found in Costa Rica.

The length of the forewings is 4.2–4.9 mm. The forewings are pale brown intermixed with a few brown scales. The hindwings are translucent pale brown.

Etymology
The specific name is derived from Latin scobis (meaning that which is scraped or scratched off, filings, shavings or sawdust).

References

Moths described in 2013
Hypatopa